Kerry John Tanner (born 25 April 1945) is a former New Zealand rugby union player. A prop, Tanner represented Canterbury at a provincial level, and was a member of the New Zealand national side, the All Blacks, from 1974 to 1976. He played 27 matches for the All Blacks including seven internationals.

References

1945 births
Living people
Rugby union players from Hamilton, New Zealand
People educated at Takapuna Grammar School
New Zealand rugby union players
New Zealand international rugby union players
Canterbury rugby union players
Rugby union props